Nazarius (rhetorician) (4th century CE), Latin rhetorician 
 Saint Nazarius (Roman Martyrology) (died c. 303 CE), one of four Roman martyrs who suffered death under Diocletian
 Saint Nazarius (abbot), the fourteenth abbot of the monastery of Lérins, probably during the reign of the Merovingian Clotaire II (584–629)
 Saint Nazarius (bishop), the legendary first bishop of Koper, Istria
 Nazarius and Celsus, two 1st century CE martyrs whose bodies were discovered by Saint Ambrose shortly after 395 CE
 John Paul Nazarius (1556–1645), Italian Dominican theologian